Senator Benedict may refer to:

Erastus C. Benedict (1800–1880), New York State Senate
Henry S. Benedict (1878–1930), California State Senate
Willis E. Benedict (1858–1917), South Dakota Senate